Agreement may refer to:

Agreements between people and organizations
 Gentlemen's agreement, not enforceable by law
 Trade agreement, between countries
 Consensus, a decision-making process
 Contract, enforceable in a court of law
 Meeting of the minds (a.k.a. mutual agreement), a common understanding in the formation of a contract
 Pact, convention, or treaty between nations, sub-national entities, organizations, corporations

Arts and media
Agreement, a 1978 book of poetry by Peter Seaton
 Agreement (film), a 1980 Bollywood film

Science and mathematics
 Agreement (linguistics) or concord, a change in the form of a word depending on grammatical features of another word
 Consistency, logical agreement between two or more propositions
 Reliability (statistics) in the sense of, for example, inter-rater agreement

Other uses
 Agreement (political party), a Polish political party
 Operation Agreement, a British 1942 military operation during the Western Desert Campaign

See also
Disagreement
Agrément, an agreement by a state to receive members of a diplomatic mission